Megachile brimleyi is a species of bee in the family Megachilidae. It was described by Mitchell in 1926.

References

Brimleyi
Insects described in 1926